Clarksville Elementary School may refer to:

Clarksville Elementary School (Clarksville, Maryland)
Clarksville Elementary School (Clarksville, New York)
Clarksville Elementary School (Clarksville, Virginia)